Du Chengyi, known professionally as A-du (阿杜), is a Singaporean singer.

Career 

Du was a construction foreman before been spotted by Singaporean producer Billy Koh in his company's talent search and was signed to Ocean Butterflies Music. He released his debut album in 2002.

Personal life 
Du married Lai Weili (賴瑋莉) in January 2016. They dated before Du became a singer for 7 years before breaking up. They re-established their relationship during when Du was diagnosed with panic disorder. They have a child in May 2016.

His nephew, Kenny Khoo, is also a singer since 2014.

Discography

Studio albums

Singles

Awards and nominations

References 

1973 births
Living people
Singaporean Mandopop singers
20th-century Singaporean male singers
21st-century Singaporean male singers

Singaporean people of Chinese descent
Singaporean Hokkien pop singers